Karen Julia Carney  (born 1 August 1987) is an English sports journalist and former professional footballer who played as a winger and midfielder. Carney has been a regular broadcaster for live football on Sky Sports and Amazon Prime, including Women's Super League and men's Premier League matches since 2019. She is also a sports columnist for BBC Sport, BBC Radio 5 Live, BBC Television, and The Guardian.

Carney began her career at Birmingham City and was twice named FA Young Player of the Year in 2005 and 2006. After signing with Arsenal, she experienced great success in 2006–07 winning the UEFA Women's Cup and all three domestic trophies: the FA Women's Premier League, FA Women's Cup, and the FA Women's Premier League Cup. Following two seasons with Chicago Red Stars in the American Women's Professional Soccer (WPS), Carney re-joined Birmingham City from 2011 to 2015. Carney finished her career with Chelsea where she was named Player of the Year in 2016 and captained the club to an FA Women's Cup title in 2017–18. She retired in July 2019.

Carney made her senior international debut for England in 2005. She represented England at four FIFA Women's World Cups (2007, 2011, 2015 and 2019) and at four UEFA Women's Championships (2005, 2009, 2013 and 2017). At the time of her retirement, she was the second most capped England player with 144 appearances, although this has since been surpassed by Jill Scott. She also represented Great Britain at the 2012 Summer Olympics.

In 2015, Carney was inducted into Birmingham City's Hall of Fame, and 2021, she was inducted into the English Football Hall of Fame. In 2017, she was appointed Member of the Order of the British Empire (MBE) for services to football.

Club career

Birmingham City, 2005–06
Carney joined Birmingham City Ladies at the age of 11 and played at various age levels for the club alongside the likes of Eniola Aluko and Laura Bassett. She made her first-team debut for Birmingham City in the FA Women's Premier League National Division against Fulham Ladies at the age of 14. She earned FA National Young Player of the Year honors in 2005 and 2006.

Move to Arsenal, 2006–09
Carney joined Arsenal Ladies on 13 July 2006, and played a major part in the team that won four major honours in the 2006/07 season: the FA Women's Premier League, FA Women's Cup, FA Women's Premier League Cup, and the UEFA Women's Cup. She made 21 appearances in the Premier League in her first season and scored 10 goals. In all competitions, she made 36 appearances and scored 13 goals. The following season saw Carney take on a greater role at Arsenal. She made 20 Premier League appearances and scored 10 goals. In all competitions, she made 34 appearances and scored 17 goals. 2008–09 marked Carney's final season with Arsenal. She made 13 Premier League appearances and scored eight goals. In all competitions, she made 21 appearances and scored 12 goals.

Chicago Red Stars, 2009–10

After a new professional league was announced in the United States, Carney was selected by Chicago Red Stars in the third round (19th overall) of the 2008 WPS International Draft. The Red Stars made Carney their first signing on 27 January 2009. It was confirmed the following day by Arsenal. She joined Head Coach Emma Hayes, who had served as Arsenal's first team assistant coach.

In the inaugural 2009 Women's Professional Soccer season, Carney appeared in and started 17 games (1471 minutes) and scored two goals while assisting on another. She scored her first goal for the club during a 4–0 win against the Boston Breakers. The Red Stars finished in sixth place with a  record.

During the 2010 season, Carney competed in 21 matches. She scored the game-winning goal against Sky Blue FC on 2 August lifting Chicago to a 2–1 win on her birthday. The Red Stars finished the regular season in sixth place with a  record.

Return to Birmingham City, 2011–15

After Chicago Red Stars folded ahead of the 2011 season, Carney re-signed for Birmingham City. During the 2011 FA WSL, she started in all 13 matches and scored 3 goals helping lift the club to a second-place finish. During a 4–0 win against Bristol City, Carney scored a brace. She scored the game-winning goal in a 2–1 win against Arsenal on 28 April.

During the 2012 season, Carney started in all 14 matches and scored 3 goals. Birmingham City finished in second place with a  record. She scored the winning goal and was Player of the Match in the 2012 FA Women's Cup Final. Due to national team obligations, Carney competed in six matches for Birmingham City during the 2013 season. The club finished in fourth place with a  record.

Carney was a starting player during the 2014 season in all 14 matches. Her 6 goals ranked first on the team and tied 
for top in the league. During a match against Manchester City on October 5, her brace led Birmingham City to a 2–1 win. In October 2014 Carney was fined and received a one-match suspension for an incident in July when she told opposition player Natalia Pablos to "fuck off back to Spain". In the last game of the 2014 FA WSL season, she missed a penalty in Birmingham City's 2–2 draw with Notts County that might have led to a league title. Birmingham City finished in third place during the regular season with a  record.

Carney was the first woman inducted into Birmingham City's Hall of Fame in March 2015. She scored two penalties in Birmingham's 3–0 win at relegation-bound Bristol Academy in September 2015, to help secure the club's WSL 1 status. Despite national team duty at the 2015 FIFA Women's World Cup in Canada, Carney finished the 2015 season with three goals in 11 matches. Birmingham City finished in sixth place with a  record.

Chelsea, 2016–19
In December 2015, Carney left Birmingham for the second time in her career, transferring to FA WSL champions Chelsea on a two-year contract. She was described as "world-class" by Chelsea manager Emma Hayes, who previously worked with Carney at Arsenal and Chicago Red Stars.

During the 2016 FA WSL, Carney scored 3 goals in 16 matches. Chelsea finished in second place with a  record. She scored the game-opening goal in the club's 4–1 against Doncaster on 24 March off a penalty. After the match, Hayes noted, "Karen Carney was at the heart and the core of everything, especially in the first half, and she looks like she's been playing at Chelsea for years. I thought she was instrumental in everything we did, whether she was on the left side, down the middle, or on the right." She scored Chelsea's second goal in the 4th minute of a 4–0 against her former club, Birmingham City on 28 August, in her hometown of Solihull. She was named the club's Player of the Year and was short-listed for England Women's Player of the Year.

After extending her contract with Chelsea through 2020, Carney's four goals in the seven matches she competed in during the 2017 FA WSL ranked third in the league. Chelsea finished in first place during the regular season with a  record. During the 2017–18 FA WSL season, she scored three goals in eight matches, including a brace against Yeovil on 29 October. Chelsea won the league title as well as the 2017–18 FA Women's Cup.

In October 2018, Carney's ninth-minute penalty goal captained Chelsea's 1–0 Women's Champions League win over Fiorentina. Carney was named to the 2018–19 Women's Champions League Squad of the Season . Following the match, Carney experienced sexist, death and abuse threats by an Instagram user after the match. The user was banned from the social media platform for threatening and abusive behaviour. Although Carney declined to press charges, England's Football Association called for police involvement. During her final season with the club, Carney scored one goal in 14 matches in the 2018–19 FA WSL.

International career

England

Carney made her senior international debut in England's 4–1 victory over Italy in 2005, coming off the bench to score England's fourth goal. She was the youngest player to earn a senior debut during Hope Powell's tenure as England coach. The same year, she was an integral part of the team at the UEFA Women's Euro 2005 and scored a last-minute, game-winning goal in the 3–2 win over Finland, which earned her significant media attention.

In her late teens, Carney won FA Young Player of the Year in 2005 and 2006. In August 2009, she was named to Powell's national team squad for Euro 2009. In the semi-final win over the Netherlands, Powell utilised 20-year-old Jessica Clarke's pace and energy to tire the Dutch full-backs, before introducing substitute Carney to decisive effect.

On 23 November 2014, Carney competed in her 100th senior international match in a 3–0 loss to Germany at Wembley Stadium in front of a record 45,619 fans. Carney was the youngest and the eighth player to earn 100 caps for England. The match marked the first time a women's national team game had been played at Wembley. Carney stated the game was her favourite moment in her career: "Getting my 100th cap for England was a real honour... It's every boy's dream to play at Wembley so for me being a girl and leading the national team out at one of the most iconic stadiums in the world is a moment I will never forget."

In May 2015, England manager Mark Sampson named Carney in his final squad for the 2015 FIFA Women's World Cup, hosted in Canada. Carney scored in England's 2–1 group stage wins over Mexico and Colombia. England eventually finished third.

Carney was named to the 2019 England World Cup squad, and earned her 141st cap in England's first match against Scotland. On 5 July 2019, Carney announced that she would retire after the World Cup third-place final match against Sweden. England lost the match 2–1, and the match saw an Ellen White goal disallowed due to handball.

Great Britain
In June 2012, Carney was named in the 18-player Great Britain squad for the 2012 Summer Olympics in London. She played in all four games as Great Britain were beaten 2–0 by Canada in the last eight.

Personal life
Carney is from Birmingham. She was born in Hall Green and attended St. Ambrose Barlow Catholic Primary School and St. Peter's RC Secondary School, Solihull. Asked about her origins and outlook in June 2019, she said, "I'm from Birmingham: my mum works at Sainsbury's, my dad is a fire-fighter. We keep it real. We know who we are. I don't need a Bentley; I don't need a Rolex”.

Carney graduated with a Bachelor of Science Degree from Loughborough University in Sports and Exercise Science with a specialization in Physiology and Sports Psychology. Her dissertation was on "The impact of caffeine on repeated sprint performance in elite female football". In 2013, she graduated from the University of Gloucestershire with a Master of Science in Sports Psychology with a specialization in Performance Psychology. Her dissertation was on "video analysis and coach reflection of team talks within football". As of 2021 she was studying towards a Master of Business Administration at the James Lind Institute, and graduated in October 2022. Carney was appointed Member of the Order of the British Empire (MBE) in the 2017 New Year Honours for services to football.

Carney and Liesel Jolly co-created "the Second Half"; a programme supporting women footballers in their careers post-football. 

Carney is a vegan and credits the diet for improving both her physical and mental health.

Career statistics

International goals 
Scores and results list England's goal tally first, score column indicates score after each Carney goal.

Honours
Birmingham City
Women's FA Cup: 2012

Arsenal
FA Women's Premier League National Division: 2005–06, 2006–07, 2007–08
FA Women's Cup: 2005–06, 2006–07, 2007–08
FA Women's Premier League Cup: 2006–07
FA Women's Community Shield: 2005–06
UEFA Women's Cup: 2006–07

Chelsea
FA Women's Cup: 2017–18

England

Cyprus Cup: 2009, 2013, 2015
UEFA Women's Championship runner-up: 2009
FIFA Women's World Cup third place: 2015
SheBelieves Cup: 2019

Individual
 FA International Young Player of the Year: 2005, 2006
 FA WSL Top Goalscorer: 2014
 Birmingham City F.C. Hall of Fame: 2015
 English Football Hall of Fame: 2021
 Women's Super League Hall of Fame: 2022

See also
 List of women's footballers with 100 or more international caps
 List of UEFA Women's Championship goalscorers
 List of players who have appeared in multiple UEFA Women's Championships
 List of players who have appeared in multiple FIFA Women's World Cups
 List of England women's international footballers
 List of football personalities with British honours
 List of Chicago Red Stars players

References

Further reading
 Aluko, Eniola (2019), They Don't Teach This, Random House, 
 Caudwell, Jayne (2013), Women's Football in the UK: Continuing with Gender Analyses, Taylor & Francis, 
 Clarke, Gemma (2019), Soccerwomen: The Icons, Rebels, Stars, and Trailblazers Who Transformed the Beautiful Game, 
 Dunn, Carrie (2019), Pride of the Lionesses: The Changing Face of Women's Football in England, Pitch Publishing (Brighton) Limited, 
 Dunn, Carrie (2016), The Roar of the Lionesses: Women's Football in England, Pitch Publishing Limited, 
 Grainey, Timothy (2012), Beyond Bend It Like Beckham: The Global Phenomenon of Women's Soccer, University of Nebraska Press,

External links

Karen Carney – The Football Association profile
Karen Carney – Chicago Red Stars profile

1987 births
Living people
English women's footballers
Alumni of Loughborough University
Birmingham City W.F.C. players
Arsenal W.F.C. players
Chelsea F.C. Women players
Chicago Red Stars players
England women's international footballers
FA Women's National League players
Expatriate women's soccer players in the United States
Women's Super League players
2007 FIFA Women's World Cup players
2011 FIFA Women's World Cup players
2015 FIFA Women's World Cup players
Footballers at the 2012 Summer Olympics
Olympic footballers of Great Britain
Sportspeople from Solihull
Women's association football forwards
English people of Irish descent
FIFA Century Club
Members of the Order of the British Empire
English expatriate women's footballers
English expatriate sportspeople in the United States
2019 FIFA Women's World Cup players
BT Sport presenters and reporters
Women sports commentators
BBC sports presenters and reporters
Women association football commentators
Association football commentators
English association football commentators
Women's Professional Soccer players
UEFA Women's Euro 2017 players
WSL Hall of Fame inductees